Hassi is a Finnish surname. Notable people with the surname include:

 Jouko Hassi (born 1959), Finnish sprinter
 Satu Hassi (born 1951), Finnish politician

Finnish-language surnames